Memories of the Desert is a 2014 Brazilian-Chilean crime drama film directed and written by Jorge Durán. It stars Daniel de Oliveira as a young Brazilian writer named Antonio, who decides to go to the Atacama Desert in search of inspiration for a tale. Daniela Ramírez and Álvaro Rudolphy co-star in supporting roles. The film was first screened on 9 March 2014 at the Miami International Film Festival, and was released theatrically in Brazil on 4 June 2015.

Plot
Antonio is a 30-year-old civil servant living in Rio de Janeiro, with a penchant for writing, who travels to the Atacama Desert in search of inspiration to write a novel. The arid and astonishing landscape leaves him in awe. One day, Antonio, hiking through the desert, hears suspicious noises and finds a dead man (whom he had met earlier in a bar). He is detained by Martínez, a local police officer, who forbids him to leave Chile or the village of San Pedro de Atacama, where he stays. Antonio also meets Florencia, a local bar-owner, with whom he develops a romantic relationship. The crime situation and his ongoing romance with Florencia help him write his tale and get mixed in it.

Cast
 Daniel de Oliveira as Antonio
 Daniela Ramírez as Florencia
 Álvaro Rudolphy as Martínez
 Roxana Campos as Miriam
 Rogério Fróes as The Old Writer
 Nelson Polania as El Hombre (as Nelson Polanco)
 Victor Montero as Romo
 María Izquierdo as Florencia's Mother

Awards and nominations
 Best Film – Bogotá Film Festival (nominated)
 The Knight Competition – Miami International Film Festival (nominated)

References

External links
 
 

2014 crime drama films
2014 films
Brazilian crime drama films
Films set in Chile
Films shot in Rio de Janeiro (city)
Portuguese-language films
2010s Spanish-language films